Corozal Airport  is an airport that serves Corozal, Belize. It is located at the south entrance of Corozal, in Ranchito village, and is therefore known as Ranchito Airport.

Airlines and Destinations

Passenger

See also

Transport in Belize
List of airports in Belize

References

External links
OurAirports - Corozal Municipal Airport
Corozal's Airport

Airports in Belize